Marcus Michael Fenix is a fictional character and the primary protagonist from the first three games in the Gears of War video game series. He first appeared in the first game of the series, released in 2006.

Appearances

Video games
Fenix debuted as the protagonist of Gears of War in 2006. Fenix is a convict who is reinstated into the Coalition of Ordered Governments' (COG) military to assist a last-ditch mission to destroy the Locust Horde. Fenix led a famed military career in the COG's previous conflicts, but was arrested after leading a failed unauthorized mission to rescue his father, Adam. Fenix joins his close friend, Dom Santiago, in Delta Squad as they succeed in helping the COG military deploy a missile strike against the Locust Horde.

Fenix retains his role throughout the trilogy, where he plays a pivotal role in humanity's conflict against the Locust Horde. He cripples the Locust Horde in Gears of War 2 by flooding their subterranean civilization. In Gears of War 3, Fenix discovers his father is alive and has developed a weapon that will destroy the Locust Horde and a new threat, the Lambent. Adam releases his weapon but dies in the process. While successful in vanquishing humanity's enemies, Fenix is distraught over the death of his loved ones and comrades, including Dom and his father. He is consoled by Anya Stroud, one of his closest allies and love interest, who assures him their sacrifices have given humanity a new hope.

Fenix transitions into the role of a supporting character in 2016's Gears of War 4, set 25 years after the events of Gears of War 3. Fenix has fathered a now adult son with Anya, James Dominic "JD" Fenix, who serves as the game's protagonist. In Gears 5, Fenix returns to active service with COG to fight a new foe, the Swarm. During a heated exchange between Marcus and COG First Minister Mina Jinn, it is revealed that Anya had passed away at some point during the 25-year antebellum period due to unspecified birthing complication issues.

He was also included as a playable character in Lost Planet 2. Fenix was added as a cosmetic outfit with Kait Diaz to Fortnite Battle Royale on December 9, 2021, During Chapter 3 Season 1 in the Item Shop.

Novels
Fenix is also the protagonist of Gears of War: Aspho Fields, a novel that expands his backstory while also providing a tie-in between the first two Gears of War games.

Reception
Fenix is a popular character and has been voted as the 19th top video game character of all time by the readers of Guinness World Records Gamer's Edition in 2011. In a poll conducted by Game Informer, Fenix was voted as the tenth best character of the decade. In 2009, GameSpot featured Marcus as one of the 64 characters in the "Greatest Game Hero" poll, in which he lost to Duke Nukem. 

The Age ranked him as the third top Xbox characters of all time in 2008, commenting, "This was a new hero for a new generation of consoles, and he came in curb-stomping shooting and chainsawing his way to the top of the charts. But behind all this is a clearly wounded, perhaps even emotionally deadened, human being, and that really resonates as the game progresses. Fenix’s legend can only grow." That same year, IGN chose Fenix as one of the characters they would like to see in an ultimate fighting game, adding, "If giant, hulking muscles and a foul tongue are all one needs to fit in with the fighting game crowd, then we might as well hand over the trophy to Marcus Fenix."Empire also ranked him the 45th greatest video game character, adding that "[o]f all the marines, in all the alternate galaxies, in all the fictional universes, the gruntiest, muscliest, most trigger-happy of them all is one Mr Marcus Fenix." GamesRadar listed him as one of the gaming's greatest badass mo-fos. In 2012, GamesRadar ranked him as the 94th "most memorable, influential, and badass" protagonist in games, saying "this dude's a legend both within the scope of his own universe as well as our own, starring in some of the best games on the Xbox 360." UGO Networks placed him 28th on its list of the "coolest" headgear in video games. In 2013, Complex ranked Marcus as the fourth greatest soldier in video games, stating that he is "one of the most badass soldiers in any game. The COGs wouldn't be the same without him." He was ranked as one of the best video game characters of the 2010s by Polygon staff and writer Charlie Hall, particularly his appearance and "I’ve probably spent more time controlling Marcus Fenix than any other avatar in all of video games. Over the years, the old man has definitely grown on me." HobbyConsolas included Marcus Fenix on their "The 30 best heroes of the last 30 years."

Computer and Video Games named him as the PC gaming's ninth worst character, contrasting him with Garrett (ninth best) and calling him "a mish-mash of Deckard from Blade Runner and Eeyore from Winnie the Pooh, constantly lamenting the situation and grumbling at any levity and delighting only in the occasional profanity" and adding: "Desperately in need of a hug, or maybe a tug, Fenix is the least likeable hero since Billy Zane played The Phantom." IGN included him on the 2009 list of top 10 most overrated video game characters ("His personality consists entirely of grunting, shouting, and shooting. (...) Calling Marcus Fenix one of the definitive gaming characters of the current generation is technically accurate, but also misleading. There isn't any real character to be had here.") and listed him as one of the worst dressed video game characters of 2011, adding that "Anya must be Helen Keller if she's attracted to that walking grime beast." In 2013, Complex included him among the ten video game characters who look like sex offenders (for looking like a stereotypical prison rapist).

References

Fictional military personnel in video games
Fictional military sergeants
Fictional soldiers in video games
Fictional special forces personnel
Fictional war veterans
Fictional characters with post-traumatic stress disorder
Gears of War
Male characters in video games
Microsoft protagonists
Science fiction video game characters
Video game characters introduced in 2006
Video game mascots
Spike Video Game Award winners